Walter McGuffie (7 December 1916 – 8 April 1996) was a British wrestler. He competed in the men's Greco-Roman flyweight at the 1948 Summer Olympics.

References

External links
 

1916 births
1996 deaths
British male sport wrestlers
Olympic wrestlers of Great Britain
Wrestlers at the 1948 Summer Olympics
Sportspeople from Bolton